Castronovo or Castronuovo may refer to:

 Castronovo di Sicilia, a comune in Sicily
 Castronuovo di Sant'Andrea, a comune in Basilicata, Italy
 Charles Castronovo, (born 1975), American tenor
 Deen Castronovo (born 1964), American drummer and singer
 Raúl Castronovo (born 1949), Argentine retired footballer
 Castronovo Chocolate, an American craft chocolate maker